Anasillus crinitus is a species of beetle in the family Cerambycidae, the only species in the genus Anasillus.

References

Acanthoderini